Don Svaty (December 13, 1943) is a former member of the Kansas House of Representatives, representing the 108th district as a Democrat.  On August 5, 2009, he succeeded his son, Joshua Svaty, who had been appointed as Kansas Secretary of Agriculture by Governor Mark Parkinson.

Don is a farmer and stockman from Ellsworth County, Kansas.

Committee membership 
 Agriculture and Natural Resources, Ranking Minority Member
 Energy and Environmental Policy, Member
 Energy and Utilities, Member

References 

 

Farmers from Kansas
Living people
Democratic Party members of the Kansas House of Representatives
People from Ellsworth, Kansas
1943 births
21st-century American politicians